Khetag Muratovich Khosonov (born 18 June 1998) is a Russian football player who plays as a defensive midfielder for Alania Vladikavkaz.

Club career
He made his debut for the main squad of PFC CSKA Moscow in the Russian Cup game against FC Yenisey Krasnoyarsk on 21 September 2016.

He made his Russian Premier League debut for CSKA on 8 September 2017 in a game against FC Amkar Perm.

On 27 July 2018, he scored the only goal of the game in extra time to win the 2018 Russian Super Cup for CSKA.

On 25 January 2019 he joined Tambov on loan until the end of the 2018–19 season. On 5 July 2019, the loan was extended for the 2019–20 season. On 1 June 2020 his loan term has expired and he left Tambov.

On 31 July 2020, he moved to his hometown club Alania Vladikavkaz.

Career statistics

Club

Honours

Club
CSKA Moscow
Russian Super Cup: 2018

References

External links
 

1998 births
Sportspeople from Vladikavkaz
Russian people of Ossetian descent
Ossetian footballers
Living people
Russian footballers
Russia youth international footballers
Association football midfielders
PFC CSKA Moscow players
FC Tambov players
Russian Premier League players
Russian First League players